Paul Huguet is a French retired slalom canoeist who competed in the late 1940s and the early 1950s. He won two medals at the 1949 ICF Canoe Slalom World Championships in Geneva with a gold in the C-1 team event and a silver in the C-1 event.

References

French male canoeists
Possibly living people
Year of birth missing
Medalists at the ICF Canoe Slalom World Championships